is a Filipino-Japanese professional basketball player for Shinshu Brave Warriors of the Japanese B.League.

Early life and education
Aquino was born on September 28, 1996 to Marlou Aquino and Marjorie Sheila Toma-Aquino. He attended Lourdes School of Mandaluyong in Metro Manila, Philippines.

College career

Adamson University
In college, Aquino first entered Adamson University first playing for the Falcons in the UAAP in Season 77.

National University (Philippines)
Aquino later moved to the National University. He made his UAAP debut for the NU Bulldogs in Season 79. He played five games for the Bulldogs before being ruled ineligible to suit up for the collegiate side due to residency issues. He was able to represent the Bulldogs in Season 80.

Amateur career
Aquino played alongside his father Marlou for the Bacoor City Strikers in the semiprofessional Maharlika Pilipinas Basketball League (MPBL). Bacoor did not renew his contract, causing Aquino to become a free agent in March 2020. He was later signed in by MPBL club Pasig Sta. Lucia Realtors.

Professional career

Shinshu Brave Warriors (2021–present)
In late 2021, Aquino was signed in to play for the Shinshu Brave Warriors of the Japanese B. League. Under league regulations he would be fielded as a local player owing to his Japanese heritage.

Career statistics

UAAP 

|-
| align="left" | 2014-15
| align="left" | Adamson
| 14 || 14.1 || .345 || .286 || .143 || 1.6 || .3 || .1 || 0.8 || 1.6
|-
| align="left" | 2016-17
| align="left"; rowspan=2| NU
| 5 || 12.9 || .143 || .200 || 1.000 || 3.0 || .6 || - || 1.2 || 2.0
|-
| align="left" | 2017-18
| 13 || 10.8 || .706 || .429 || .571 || 3.0 || .1 || .1 || .9 || 4.8
|-class=sortbottom
| align="center" colspan=2 | Career
| 32 || 12.6 || .440 || .292 || .500 || 2.4 || .3 || .1 || .9 || 3.0

National team career
Aquino has been named part of the Japan national team pool for the first window of the 2023 FIBA Basketball World Cup qualifiers in November 2021. He is initially hesitant since playing for Japan would mean he won't be eligible to play for the Philippines national team but he was encouraged by his father to pursue the chance to play for Japan since it was in the East Asian country where he got an opportunity to play for a national team. He was not named part of the final roster for November 2021 window but was invited to join further training camps in 2022. He made his debut for Japan on February 26, 2022 in the national team's 76-71 win over Chinese Taipei in the World Cup qualifiers.

Personal life
Matthew's father, Marlou Aquino is also a former professional basketball player who played in the Philippine Basketball Association (PBA). Aquino has Japanese heritage, through his maternal grandmother. Aquino often turns to his father and his sister Marla when it comes to making key decisions in his life including his basketball career.

References

External links
 

1996 births
Living people
Adamson Soaring Falcons basketball players
Filipino men's basketball players
Filipino people of Japanese descent
Japanese men's basketball players
Maharlika Pilipinas Basketball League players
NU Bulldogs basketball players
Power forwards (basketball)
Centers (basketball)
Shinshu Brave Warriors players
Citizens of Japan through descent